Lithal can mean:

 Lithium aluminium hydride (LiAlH4), also abbreviated to LAH, a powerful reducing agent used in organic synthesis
 Lithalsa, a term sometimes used in geomorphology for designing a pingo, a palsa, or a hydrolaccolith